Willowbrook State School was a state-supported institution for children with intellectual disabilities located in the Willowbrook neighborhood on Staten Island in New York City from 1947 until 1987.

The school was designed for 4,000, but by 1965 it had a population of 6,000. At the time, it was the biggest state-run institution for people with mental disabilities in the United States. Conditions and questionable medical practices and experiments prompted Senator Robert F. Kennedy to call it a "snake pit." The institution gained national infamy in 1972, when Geraldo Rivera did an exposé on the conditions there. Public outcry led to its closure in 1987, and to federal civil rights legislation protecting people with disabilities. A February 2020 New York Times investigation found that the alumni of Willowbrook continue to be abused in smaller group homes.

A portion of the grounds and some of the buildings were incorporated into the campus of the College of Staten Island, which moved to Willowbrook in the early 1990s.

Construction and early conversion
Construction was completed in 1942, but instead of opening for its original purpose, it was converted into a United States Army hospital, and named Halloran General Hospital, after the late Colonel Paul Stacey Halloran. After World War II, proposals were introduced to turn the site over to the Veterans Administration, but in October 1947, the New York State Department of Mental Hygiene opened its facility there as originally planned, and the institution was named Willowbrook State School.

Hepatitis studies
Throughout the first decade of its operation, outbreaks of hepatitis, primarily hepatitis A, were common at the school. This led to controversial medical studies being carried out there between 1956 and 1971 by medical researchers Saul Krugman (New York University) and Robert W. McCollum (Yale University), who monitored subjects to gauge the effects of gamma globulin in combating it. One result of the research was a better understanding of the differences between serum hepatitis, which is spread by blood transfusions, and infectious hepatitis, which is spread directly from person to person and is the more common form. A public outcry forced the research project and medical studies to be discontinued.

Paul A. Offit described Krugman's studies as follows:

In an effort to control outbreaks of hepatitis, the medical staff at Willowbrook consulted Saul Krugman.... Krugman found that hepatitis developed in 90 percent of children admitted to Willowbrook soon after their arrival. Although it was known that hepatitis was caused by a virus, it wasn't known how hepatitis virus spread, whether it could be prevented, or how many types of viruses caused the disease. Krugman used the children of Willowbrook to answer those questions. One of his studies involved feeding live hepatitis virus from others stool samples to sixty healthy children. Krugman watched as their skin and eyes turned yellow and their livers got bigger. He watched them vomit and refuse to eat. All the children fed hepatitis virus became ill, some severely. Krugman reasoned that it was justifiable to inoculate retarded children at Willowbrook with hepatitis virus because most of them would get hepatitis anyway. But by purposefully giving the children hepatitis, Krugman increased that chance to 100 percent.

According to vaccinologist Maurice Hilleman, "They [the Willowbrook studies] were the most unethical medical experiments ever performed on children in the United States." Historian David Rothman notes that, "The research was even included in Henry Beecher's 1966 New England Journal of Medicine listing of 'ethically dubious' experiments." Bioethicist Art Caplan has stated that, "The Willowbrook studies were a turning point in how we thought about medical experiments on retarded children... Children inoculated with hepatitis virus had no chance to benefit from the procedure—only the chance to be harmed."

Scandals and abuses
By 1965, Willowbrook housed over 6,000 intellectually disabled people despite having a maximum capacity of 4,000. Senator Robert F. Kennedy toured the institution in 1965 and proclaimed that individuals in the overcrowded facility were "living in filth and dirt, their clothing in rags, in rooms less comfortable and cheerful than the cages in which we put animals in a zoo" and offered a series of recommendations for improving conditions. Although the hepatitis study had been discontinued, the residential school's reputation was that of a warehouse for New York City's mentally disabled people, many of whom were presumably abandoned there by their families, foster care agencies, or other systems designed to care for them. Donna J. Stone, an advocate for mentally disabled children as well as victims of child abuse, gained access to the school by posing as a recent social work graduate. She then shared her observations with members of the press.

A series of articles in local newspapers, including the Staten Island Advance and the Staten Island Register, described the crowded, filthy living conditions at Willowbrook, and the negligent treatment of some of its residents. Jane Kurtin was the first reporter to write a story about Willowbrook State School after she visited Willowbrook in order to cover a demonstration that social workers and parents of the residents had organized.  Kurtin wanted to get inside the buildings, and social workers Elizabeth Lee and Ira Fisher brought her inside. Shortly thereafter, in early 1972, Geraldo Rivera, then an investigative reporter for WABC-TV in New York, conducted a series of investigations at Willowbrook uncovering a host of deplorable conditions, including overcrowding, inadequate sanitary facilities, and physical and sexual abuse of residents by members of the school's staff. Rivera then visited several facilities in California. While the conditions in the California facilities were found to have been significantly improved, the conditions at Willowbrook remained neglectful.  The exposé, entitled Willowbrook: The Last Great Disgrace, garnered national attention and won a Peabody Award for Rivera. Rivera later appeared on the nationally televised Dick Cavett Show with film of patients at the school. As a result of the overcrowding and inhumane conditions, a class-action lawsuit was filed against the State of New York by the parents of 5,000 residents of Willowbrook in federal court on March 17, 1972. This was known as New York ARC v. Rockefeller. Elizabeth Lee's employment was terminated in 1972 as a result of her activism with the parents.

In 1975, a consent judgment was signed, and it committed New York state to improve community placement for the, now designated, "Willowbrook Class." The publicity generated by the case was a major contributing factor to the passage of a federal law — the Civil Rights of Institutionalized Persons Act of 1980.

According to a February 2020 New York Times investigation "[t]hat vow has been broken: Many of the institution's 2,300 alumni who are alive today still suffer from mistreatment." The Times reported that in 2019 there have been "97 reported allegations of physical abuse by group home workers against Willowbrook alumni..." also "34 allegations of psychological abuse and hundreds more of neglect and other mistreatment, like improper use of restraints or seclusion, medication errors and theft." Investigations were conducted by the New York State Office for People With Developmental Disabilities but were unable to prove abuse claiming that "Strong union protections allowed them to block their dismissals in arbitration." Bronx County District Attorney Darcel Clark investigated one facility that houses Willowbrook alumni but found insufficient evidence for abuse, witnesses not willing to come forward, and victims not able to speak for themselves. "It’s not whether or not it happened," she said. "It's what could we prove."

Closure
In 1975, a Willowbrook Consent Decree was signed that committed New York state to improve community placement for the now designated "Willowbrook Class."

In 1983, the state of New York announced plans to close Willowbrook, which had been renamed the Staten Island Developmental Center in 1974. By the end of March 1986, the number of residents housed there had dwindled to 250, and the last children left the grounds on September 17, 1987. After the developmental center closed, the site became the focus of intense local debate about what should be done with the property. In 1989, a portion of the land was acquired by the city of New York, with the intent of using it to establish a new campus for the College of Staten Island, and the new campus opened at Willowbrook in 1993. This campus is the largest maintained by the City University of New York. Within the year, one of CSI's two other existing campuses, located in the Sunnyside neighborhood, was closed, renovated, and reopened in 1995 as the home of the new K-12 Michael J. Petrides School. The rest of Willowbrook's original property is still under the administration of the Office for People with Developmental Disabilities (OPWDD) —an agency of New York State— and houses the New York State Institute for Basic Research in Developmental Disabilities, and the Staten Island Developmental Disabilities Service Office.

On February 25, 1987, the Federal Court approved the Willowbrook "1987 Stipulation," which set forth guidelines that required OMRDD (Office of Mental Retardation and Developmental Disabilities; renamed the Office for People With Developmental Disabilities, in July 2010) community placement for the "Willowbrook Class." The Willowbrook School was closed that year. All but about 150 of the former Willowbrook residents were moved to group homes by 1992. Significant members of the "Willowbrook Class" were not as intellectually limited as the term "developmental delay" would indicate. Some had cerebral palsy, a developmental disability that can be accompanied by varying degrees of intellectual impairment, and some members of this class were cognitively quite intact, yet unable to communicate verbally due to their physical condition. These ex-residents of Willowbrook, many now in their 50s and 60s, live in a variety of community residences and attend day programs throughout New York State, under the care of organizations such as United Cerebral Palsy or the Jewish Guild for the Blind.

In the 1991 book The Soul of a Cop, retired NYPD detective Paul Ragonese describes responding to "building two" of the abandoned Willowbrook campus as a member of the NYPD Bomb Squad. Ragonese describes an abandoned building full of hazardous chemicals, including explosive picric acid crystals, along with rooms full of jars containing specimens of human organs. Ragonese goes on to write that the incident was largely covered up by local officials.

Former students
In 1997, Danny Aiello hosted, and Geraldo Rivera served as commentator for, a 57-minute documentary titled Unforgotten: 25 Years After Willowbrook, which revisits Staten Island's Willowbrook State School, "remembering the over 5,000 children who were living in the facility at the time and focusing on three former residents, to see how the effects of the institution have been felt by families and friends of patients as well." Writes The New York Times reviewer, Stephen Holden:

As graphically as it recounts the horrors of the past, Unforgotten is less concerned with raking the coals of an old scandal than with showing how the treatment of the mentally disabled has since improved. The film ... focuses on the lives of two who were once incarcerated at Willowbrook but subsequently flourished in group homes situated in close proximity to their families. / A third longtime resident of Willowbrook, Bernard Carabello, is also interviewed. Mr. Carabello, who suffers from cerebral palsy, spent 18 years at Willowbrook after being misdiagnosed as mentally retarded at the age of 3. / In looking at the lives of Patty Ann Meskell and Luis Rivera (who died shortly after the film was completed), both of whom spent many years at Willowbrook, the movie stresses their essential humanity. Each is shown interacting with loving family members who are still deeply stung by memories of visits to Willowbrook more than 25 years ago. / The film, narrated by Danny Aiello, isn't so much an investigative documentary as a blunt plea for the humane treatment of the mentally disabled. It also warns that despite changes in social attitudes (the Special Olympics are cited as a shining example of progress), Willowbrook could happen again. Remembrance is a vital key to the prevention of future abuse.

In March 2009, a fire in a residence in Wells, New York, killed four members of the "Willowbrook Class."

Willowbrook State Hospital is mentioned in the 2009 documentary movie Cropsey as having reportedly housed convicted child kidnapper Andre Rand, who had previously worked there as an orderly. One of Rand's supposed victims, Jennifer Schweiger, was found buried in a shallow grave behind the grounds of the abandoned Willowbrook State School, which was built under the same design as Pilgrim State Hospital.

In 2011, a former resident of Willowbrook State School, a savant named Anthony Torrone, wrote a Christian prayer book titled Anthony's Prayers that was inspired by his time and the abuse he experienced at the school.

See also

Developmental disability
Human experimentation in the United States
Summit Children's Residence Center
The Ladd School
Trenton Psychiatric Hospital
Tuskegee Syphilis Study
Walter E. Fernald State School

References

Further reading

 

Hospital buildings completed in 1942
School buildings completed in 1942
Government buildings completed in 1928
Defunct hospitals in Staten Island
Hospitals established in 1942
1987 disestablishments in New York (state)
Human subject research in the United States
Psychiatry controversies
Psychiatric hospitals in New York (state)
Defunct schools in New York City
1928 establishments in New York City
Intellectual disability hospitals
New York State Department of Mental Hygiene